They Stole a Tram, aka We Stole a Tram, is a 1954 Italian comedy film written by and starring Aldo Fabrizi, and directed by Fabrizi and his assistant director Sergio Leone after director Mario Bonnard) left the film midway completed. Sergio Leone also appeared in a brief scene as a contest presenter, Mario Bava was the film's cinematographer and future horror film director Lucio Fulci contributed to the screenplay. The film's music score was by Carlo Rustichelli.

Plot
Tram conductor Cesare Mancini (Aldo Fabrizi) accidentally hits a woman riding on a bicycle, and gets demoted down to a humble ticket taker.

Cast  
Aldo Fabrizi as Cesare Mancini
Carlo Campanini as  Bernasconi
Juan de Landa as  Rossi
Lucia Banti as  Marcella
Mimo Billi as  Caposervizio
Fernanda Giordani as  Suocera
Lia Rainer  as Teresa
Bruno Corelli  as Pretore
Sergio Leone  as the presenter of the contest
Zoe Incrocci

References

External links

1954 films
1954 comedy films
Italian comedy films
Films directed by Mario Bonnard
Films directed by Aldo Fabrizi
Films directed by Sergio Leone
Films with screenplays by Lucio Fulci
Films with screenplays by Ruggero Maccari
Films scored by Carlo Rustichelli
Films with screenplays by Luciano Vincenzoni
Italian black-and-white films
1950s Italian films